Akron is an unincorporated community in Boone County, Nebraska, United States.

History
The community's name most likely is a transfer from Akron, Ohio. A post office was established at Akron in 1881, and remained in operation until it was discontinued in 1905.

References

Unincorporated communities in Boone County, Nebraska
Unincorporated communities in Nebraska